The teams event of the 2022 BWF World Junior Championships is being held from 17 – 22 October 2022. The event is also known as the 2022 Suhandinata Cup. Indonesia was the champion of the last edition held in Kazan, Russia.

38 countries representing all five continental federations are competing in this event. The group draw was done on 10 August. First seed, Indonesia were drawn with Malaysia, Sweden and Latvia in group A. Spain as the host were drawn with Estonia, Belgium, Hong Kong and Norway in group F.

Squads

Seedings
The seedings for teams competing in the tournament were released on July 26, 2022. It was based on aggregated points from the best players in the BWF World Junior Ranking. The teams was divided into three pots, with Indonesia and Ukraine were the two top seeds with another 6 teams, another 8 teams were put in the second groups. Twenty-two other teams (seeded 17-38) were seeded into third groups. The draw was held on 10 August in Kuala Lumpur.

Group 1 (Seeded 1-8)

Group 2 (Seeded 9-16)

Group 3 (Seeded 17-38)

Group composition 
The draw for 38 teams competing in the tournament were announced on 10 August 2022.

Group stage

Group A

Group B

Group C

Group D

Group E

Group F

Group G

Group H

Final stage

1st to 8th

1st to 8th quarterfinals

5th to 8th semifinals

7th-8th place match

5th-6th place match

1st to 4th semifinals

Final

9th to 16th

9th to 16th quarterfinals

13th to 16th semifinals

15th-16th place match

13th-14th place match

9th to 12th semifinals

11th-12th place match

9th-10th place match

17th to 24th

17th to 24th quarterfinals

21st to 24th semifinals

23rd-24th place match

21st-22nd place match

17th to 20th semifinals

19th-20th place match

17th-18th place match

25th to 32nd

25th to 32nd quarterfinals

29th to 32nd semifinals

31st-32nd place match

29th-30th place match

25th to 28th semifinals

27th-28th place match

25th-26th place match

33rd to 37th
</onlyinclude>

Final standings

References

External links
 Tournament draw

Teams
World Junior